In computational complexity theory, the class NC (for "Nick's Class") is the set of decision problems decidable in polylogarithmic time on a parallel computer with a polynomial number of processors.  In other words, a problem with input size n is in NC if there exist constants c and k such that it can be solved in time  using  parallel processors. Stephen Cook coined the name "Nick's class" after Nick Pippenger, who had done extensive research on circuits with polylogarithmic depth and polynomial size.

Just as the class P can be thought of as the tractable problems (Cobham's thesis), so NC can be thought of as the problems that can be efficiently solved on a parallel computer. NC is a subset of P because polylogarithmic parallel computations can be simulated by polynomial-time sequential ones. It is unknown whether NC = P, but most researchers suspect this to be false, meaning that there are probably some tractable problems that are "inherently sequential" and cannot significantly be sped up by using parallelism. Just as the class NP-complete can be thought of as "probably intractable", so the class P-complete, when using NC reductions, can be thought of as "probably not parallelizable" or "probably inherently sequential".

The parallel computer in the definition can be assumed to be a parallel, random-access machine (PRAM).  That is a parallel computer with a central pool of memory, and any processor can access any bit of memory in constant time.  The definition of NC is not affected by the choice of how the PRAM handles simultaneous access to a single bit by more than one processor. It can be CRCW, CREW, or EREW. See PRAM for descriptions of those models.

Equivalently, NC can be defined as those decision problems decidable by a uniform Boolean circuit (which can be calculated from the length of the input, for NC, we suppose we can compute the Boolean circuit of size n in logarithmic space in n) with polylogarithmic depth and a polynomial number of gates with a maximum fan-in of 2.

RNC is a class extending NC with access to randomness.

Problems in NC 
As with P, by a slight abuse of language, one might classify function problems and search problems as being in NC. NC is known to include many problems, including
 Integer addition, multiplication and division;
 Matrix multiplication, determinant, inverse, rank;
 Polynomial GCD, by a reduction to linear algebra using Sylvester matrix
 Finding a maximal matching.

Often algorithms for those problems had to be separately invented and could not be naïvely adapted from well-known algorithms – Gaussian elimination and Euclidean algorithm rely on operations performed in sequence. One might contrast ripple carry adder with a carry-lookahead adder.

Example 
An example of problem in NC1 is the parity check on a bit string. The problem consists in counting the number of 1s in a string made of 1 and 0. A simple solution consists in summing all the string's bits. Since addition is associative, .

The NC hierarchy 
NCi is the class of decision problems decidable by uniform boolean circuits with a polynomial number of gates of at most two inputs and depth , or the class of decision problems solvable in time O(logi n) on a parallel computer with a polynomial number of processors. Clearly, we have

which forms the NC-hierarchy.

We can relate the NC classes to the space classes L and NL and AC.

The NC classes are related to the AC classes, which are defined similarly, but with gates having unbounded fan-in.  For each i, we have

As an immediate consequence of this, we have that NC = AC.
It is known that both inclusions are strict for i = 0.

Similarly, we have that NC is equivalent to the problems solvable on an alternating Turing machine restricted to at most two options at each step with O(log n) space and  alternations.

Open problem: Is NC proper? 
One major open question in complexity theory is whether or not every containment in the NC hierarchy is proper. It was observed by Papadimitriou that, if NCi = NCi+1 for some i, then NCi = NCj for all j ≥ i, and as a result, NCi = NC. This observation is known as NC-hierarchy collapse because even a single equality in the chain of containments

implies that the entire NC hierarchy "collapses" down to some level i. Thus, there are 2 possibilities:

 
 

It is widely believed that (1) is the case, although no proof as to the truth of either statement has yet been discovered.

NC0
The special class NC0 operates only on a constant length of input bits. It is therefore described as the class of functions definable by uniform boolean circuits with constant depth and bounded fan-in.

Barrington's theorem
A branching program with n variables of width k and length m consists of a sequence of m instructions. Each of the instructions is a tuple (i, p, q) where i is the index of variable to check (1 ≤ i ≤ n), and p and q are functions from {1, 2, ..., k} to {1, 2, ..., k}. Numbers 1, 2, ..., k are called states of the branching program. The program initially starts in state 1, and each instruction (i, p, q) changes the state from x to p(x) or q(x), depending on whether the ith variable is 0 or 1. The function mapping an input to a final state of the program is called the yield of the program (more precisely, the yield on an input is the function mapping any initial state to the corresponding final state). The program accepts a set  of variable values when there is some set of functions  such that a variable sequence  is in A precisely when its yield is in F.  

A family of branching programs consists of a branching program with n variables for each n. It accepts a language when the n variable program accepts the language restricted to length n inputs.

It is easy to show that every language L on {0,1} can be recognized by a family of branching programs of width 5 and exponential length, or by a family of exponential width and linear length.

Every regular language on {0,1} can be recognized by a family of branching programs of constant width and linear number of instructions (since a DFA can be converted to a branching program). BWBP denotes the class of languages recognizable by a family of branching programs of bounded width and polynomial length.

Barrington's theorem says that BWBP is exactly nonuniform NC1. The proof uses the nonsolvability of the symmetric group S5.

The theorem is rather surprising. For instance, it implies that the majority function can be computed by a family of branching programs of constant width and polynomial size, while intuition might suggest that to achieve polynomial size, one needs a linear number of states.

Proof of Barrington's theorem
A branching program of constant width and polynomial size can be easily converted (via divide-and-conquer) to a circuit in NC1.

Conversely, suppose a circuit in NC1 is given. Without loss of generality, assume it uses only AND and NOT gates.

Call a branching program α-computing a circuit C if it works as identity when 's output is 0, and as  when 's output is 1.

The size of the branching program is at most 4, where d is the depth of the circuit. If the circuit has logarithmic depth, the branching program has polynomial length.

Notes

References
 
 
 Greenlaw, Raymond, James Hoover, and Walter Ruzzo. Limits To Parallel computation; P-Completeness Theory. 
  Lectures 28 - 34 and 36
  Lecture 12: Relation of NC to Time-Space Classes
 
 
 

Complexity classes
Circuit complexity